Richard Holden may refer to:

Sports
Rick Holden (born 1964), English footballer
Dick Holden (1885–?), English footballer
Richard Holden (tennis), played Tennis at the 1995 Summer Universiade

Others
Richard Holden (British politician), Member of Parliament for North West Durham since December 2019
Richard Holden (economist) (born 1974), Australian economist
Richard Holden (Canadian politician) (1931–2005), Canadian lawyer and politician
Richard Holden (dancer) (1927–2015), American dancer and choreographer
Richard Holden (New Zealand), businessman and mayoral candidate, see Les Mills
Richard Holden (highway patrol) (?–2014), American highway patrol commander